Abdullah H. Abdur-Razzaq (December 20, 1931 – November 21, 2014) was an African-American activist and Muslim known for being one of Malcolm X's most trusted associates. Born James Monroe King Warden, he was known as James 67X when he belonged to the Nation of Islam and James Shabazz in the years after he left the organization.

Early life
James Monroe King Warden was born in Brooklyn, New York, and raised in the impoverished Morningside Heights neighborhood of Manhattan. He attended the Bronx High School of Science, from which he graduated with honors. He enrolled in the City College of New York but transferred to Lincoln University in Chester County, Pennsylvania, after a year. He soon left that school as well to join the Army. Following his discharge, he returned to Lincoln and graduated with honors in English in 1958. He received a master's degree from Columbia University.

His work
In 1958, Warden joined the Nation of Islam at Mosque No. 7, on 102 West 116th Street in New York City, under Minister Malcolm X. As was the custom among Nation of Islam members, he abandoned the surname of Warden as a vestige of chattel slavery and became the 67th James in Mosque No. 7.

By 1960, he had been promoted to lieutenant in the Fruit of Islam, subordinate to Captain Joseph X. Gravitt (later known as Yusuf Shah). Subsequently, he was appointed circulation manager for New York, New Jersey, and Connecticut of Muhammad Speaks, and answered directly to Malcolm X.

After the split between Malcolm X and the Nation of Islam, Malcolm X formed Muslim Mosque, Inc. and appointed James, then still known as James 67X, secretary of the organization, as well as captain of the men. Based on Malcolm X's instruction, he took the name James Shabazz.

Brother James, as he was sometimes referred, was also responsible for the formation of the Organization of Afro-American Unity, a secular organization that Malcolm X had also formed, patterned after Addis Ababa, Ethiopia's Organisation of African Unity, and through which Malcolm X intended to charge the United States with violating the human rights of its chattel slave descendants.

Shabazz was a constant and willing aide to Malcolm X, in his capacity as head of Muslim Mosque, Inc. and as head of the Organization of Afro-American Unity. He remained with, and vigorously assisted Malcolm X until the leader's murder on February 21, 1965.

Post-Malcolm X days
Abdur-Razzaq spent the years following Malcolm X's murder raising a family and co-founding Al-Karim School (which would later become Brooklyn's famed Cush Campus Schools) with Ora Abdur-Razzaq. He later moved to Guyana, where he worked as a farmer. Returning to the U.S. in 1988, he earned a nursing degree, and he worked in as a nurse until his retirement in 2004.

In his later years, Abdur-Razzaq's work as staff consultant for the Schomburg Center for Research in Black Culture was invaluable in cataloging rare photographs, letters and accounts of Malcolm X's life and times. Furthermore, his expertise was widely solicited by journalists, authors, film makers and educators. In addition to his contributions to a wide array of published works, such as Bruce Perry's Malcolm X: The Last Speeches, Abdur-Razzaq was featured in several television interviews and films, including Malcolm X: Make It Plain and Gil Noble's Like It Is. The DVD version of Jack Baxter's documentary Brother Minister: The Assassination of Malcolm X includes an "Exclusive Interview with Abdullah Abdur-Razzaq, Malcolm X's closest associate".

Final years and death
In April 2013, Abdur-Razzaq returned to Lincoln University to speak about his memories and experiences working with Malcolm X.

Battling leukemia, Abdur-Razzaq was admitted to Harlem Hospital in late 2014. After several weeks, he was transferred to Bellevue Hospital Center, where he died on November 21, 2014, at the age of 82.

He is survived by 11 children, grandchildren, and a large extended family. Yvonne Celeste Warden,his only wife, preceded him in death.

References

External links
   Frequently Asked Questions About Malcolm X, a website by Abdur-Razzaq
 

1931 births
2014 deaths
People from Morningside Heights, Manhattan
People from Brooklyn
Converts to Islam
Nation of Islam religious leaders
African-American activists
African-American Muslims
African-American writers
American writers
Malcolm X
Deaths from leukemia
United States Army soldiers
African-American nurses
American nurses
Religious leaders from New York City
Activists from New York (state)
Male nurses
City College of New York alumni
Lincoln University (Pennsylvania) alumni
Columbia University alumni
Deaths from cancer in New York (state)